Sarah Baker may refer to:
Sarah Baker (actress) American actress and comedian.
Sarah Baker (singer) (born 1943)
Sarah Baker (painter) (1899–1983), American artist
Sarah Martha Baker (1887–1917), English botanist and ecologist
Sarah Baker (18th-century actress) (1736/37–1816)